was a town located in Kitauonuma District, Niigata Prefecture, Japan.

As of 2003, the town was estimated population of 9,403 and a density of 136.28 persons per km². The total area was 69.00 km².

On November 1, 2004, Horinouchi, along with the town of Koide, and the villages of Hirokami, Irihirose, Sumon and Yunotani (all from Kitauonuma District), was merged to create the city of Uonuma.

Transportation

Railway
 JR East - Jōetsu Line
  -

Highway

See also
 Uonuma

External links
 Uonuma Tourist Association 

Dissolved municipalities of Niigata Prefecture
Uonuma, Niigata